C. Y. Cyrus Chu (born 29 October 1955) is a Taiwanese economist and politician. He holds a Bachelor of Law (Department of Business) from National Taiwan University (1978) and PhD in economics from the University of Michigan (1985). He joined the Department of Business Administration and Economics at National Taiwan University thereafter and was promoted to Professor in 1989. He has published 2 monographs on demography and family economics, respectively, both published by Oxford University Press, and more than 100 professional articles in journals including American Economic Review and Journal of Political Economy. He was Vice President of Academia Sinica (2000–2003) and Chairman of Board at Chung-Hwa Institution for Economic Research (2008-2011), and has been a Distinguished Research Fellow at the Institute of Economics, Academia Sinica since 2000. He was elected as an Academician of Academia Sinica (1998), a Member of The World Academy of Sciences (2010), Foreign Associate of the National Academy of Sciences in the United States (2017). He recently joined the WID team of Thomas Piketty, analysing the taxation and wealth-registration individual data of Taiwan.
From 2011 to 2019, he served as Minister without Portfolio, supervising science and technology, then Minister of National Science Council (renamed the Ministry of Science and Technology) of Executive Yuan of Republic of China (Taiwan), then Ambassador and Permanent Representative of the Separate Customs Territory of Taiwan, Penghu, Kinmen and Matsu to the World Trade Organization in Geneva.

National Science Council Ministry
Chu took office in February 2011.

Taiwan brain drain crisis
During an August 2012 conference, Chu commented on the growing brain drain in Taiwan, stating that more and more Taiwanese move to Mainland China due to better job offers and benefits. He added that due to the conservative nature of Taiwanese society, most foreign workers in Taiwan are blue-collar workers, and the remaining white-collar workers typically teach English, and are not leaders of big companies.

The National Science Council was later renamed the Ministry of Science and Technology, and in March 2014, Chu stepped down to be replaced by Chang San-cheng.

Representative to the World Trade Organization
Chu succeeded Lai Shin-yuan as Taiwan's representative to the World Trade Organization in July 2016. He was sworn in a month later, on 2 August. In March 2017, Chu was elected a member of the United States National Academy of Sciences. Chu submitted his resignation on 23 August 2019, and it became effective on 31 August 2019.

Select Publications in English
Population Dynamics: A New Economic Approach, Oxford University Press, 1998.
Population and Economic Change in East Asia: a supplement to Population and Development Review, edited with Ronald Demos Lee, 2000.
Understanding Chinese Families: A Comparative Study of Taiwan and Southeast China, with Ruoh-Rong Yu, foreword by James J. Heckman, Oxford University Press, 2009.

References

1955 births
Living people
Ministers of Science and Technology of the Republic of China
Academic staff of the National Taiwan University
Taiwanese educators
University of Michigan alumni
Foreign associates of the National Academy of Sciences
Members of Academia Sinica
Taiwanese expatriates in the United States